Lanam is an unincorporated community in Jackson Township, Brown County, in the U.S. state of Indiana. 

The community was founded by Rev. John Lanam in 1875.

Geography

References

Unincorporated communities in Brown County, Indiana
Unincorporated communities in Indiana